Scoparia x-signata is a moth in the family Crambidae. It was described by Ivan Nikolayevich Filipjev in 1927. It is found in Russia, where it has been recorded from Siberia.

References

Moths described in 1927
Scorparia